Pukhov (from пух meaning feather) is a Russian masculine surname, its feminine counterpart is Pukhova. It may refer to:
Ilya Pukhov (born 1992), Belarusian football player
Nikolai Pukhov (1895–1958), Soviet military commander
Pavel Pukhov (1983–2013), Russian street artist
Roman Pukhov (born 2000), Russian football player
Rufina Pukhova (1932–2021), Russian memoir writer
Ruslan Pukhov (born 1973), Russian defense analyst
Stanislav Pukhov (born 1977), Russian badminton player
Timur Pukhov (born 1998), Russian football player
Zoya Pukhova (1936–2016), Soviet politician

Russian-language surnames